The Sound of Life Radio Network is a regional Contemporary Christian music network headquartered in Lake Katrine, New York and serves eastern New York State, northern New Jersey, northeast Pennsylvania, and western New England. Programming on the network is primarily music based with short programming features interspersed throughout the day. Short feature programs are practical, family oriented and directed at applying faith to everyday life. The network's feature segment is the Cup 'A Joe Morning Show with morning show host Joe Hunter who has been on the air with the network since 1993. The Sound of Life is streamed 24/7 through their website and mobile apps.

History 
Sound of Life was incorporated in the early 1980s by a group of people in the Kingston, New York area who wanted to begin a faith-based radio station for the Hudson Valley which would encourage and reach out to and be supported by listeners. After nearly buying WHVW in 1982, the network obtained the construction permit for 89.7 MHz Kingston, which signed on as WFGB on January 9, 1985.

Repeaters 
, Sound of Life programming is also heard on the following frequencies:

Translators

External links 
 Sound of Life Homepage

Christian mass media companies
American radio networks